Takeyuki (written: 武幸, 武行 or 竹通) is a masculine Japanese given name. Notable people with the name include:

, Japanese anime director
, Japanese marathon runner
, Japanese footballer and manager

Japanese masculine given names